The northern crombec (Sylvietta brachyura) is a species of African warbler, formerly placed in the family Sylviidae.
It is found in Benin, Burkina Faso, Cameroon, Central African Republic, Chad, Democratic Republic of the Congo, Ivory Coast, Djibouti, Eritrea, Ethiopia, Gambia, Ghana, Guinea, Guinea-Bissau, Kenya, Mali, Mauritania, Niger, Nigeria, Senegal, Sierra Leone, Somalia, Sudan, Tanzania, Togo, and Uganda.
Its natural habitat is dry savanna.

References

northern crombec
Birds of Sub-Saharan Africa
northern crombec
Taxonomy articles created by Polbot